Maji may refer to:

Places 
 Maji, Ethiopia, city in southwestern Ethiopia
 Maji (woreda)
 Maji, Iran, a village
Maji, Luhe District, a town in Jiangsu Province, China

Other uses 
 Maji (surname), an Indian family name
 Dizi people, also known as Maji, an ethnic group in Ethiopia
 Dizin language, or Maji, an Omotic language of Ethiopia spoken by the Dizi people

See also
 Maji Maji Rebellion, a rebellion in German East Africa
 Majhi (disambiguation)
 Majji
 Magee (disambiguation)
 Magi (disambiguation)
 Machi (disambiguation)